Pepsi Twist is a lemon flavored cola, marketed by PepsiCo as an alternative to regular Pepsi.

History
The first incarnation of Pepsi Light was cola and lemon flavor with 50% fewer calories. It was soon replaced with lemon-flavored diet cola of the same name in the 1970s and 1980s in the United States called Pepsi Light, which was lemon-flavored by necessity to counteract the aftertaste of the artificial sweetener saccharin. When aspartame became more widely available, the lemon flavoring was removed from the newly rechristened Diet Pepsi.

Pepsi Twist was introduced in the United States on July 12, 2000 and again on June 12, 2001 until it was discontinued in the summer of 2006. 

Pepsi launched Pepsi A-ha, with a lemon flavor in India, in 2002.

Pepsi Twist was marketed in Brazil (with lime instead of lemon), where a limited-edition version was also sold, the Pepsi Twistão, with an even stronger lime flavor. 

It has also been released in Portugal as a limited edition during summer, and has remained popular.

In the Philippines, it was released in 2002 and was an instant hit among the teenagers but failed to capture the market.

Pepsi Twist was also marketed in Pakistan in 2006. The product failed to capture the market, but it is still available in some supermarkets.

It is marketed in Romania under the name Pepsi Twist Lemon. It was sold under the name of Pepsi Twist until recently, and its diet counterpart, Pepsi Twist Light Lemon.

It is available in Albania, Greece, and China, and selected supermarkets in Germany. 

It was introduced in Poland in the summer of 2002 and in Italy in late 2002. It is still a fairly popular drink in the former.

It was also released in Bosnia and Herzegovina in the late 2006. It is still marketing today, and it outsells the original Pepsi.

In the United Kingdom, Netherlands and Belgium, the original Pepsi Twist was sold for a while, and was replaced by Pepsi Max Twist, a "lemon and lime" version which has also been discontinued. It has since been returned under the "Pepsi Max Cool Lemon" brand.

In Ukraine, Pepsi Twist was marketed and sold during 2004. In 2012 reintroduced under "Pepsi +1" logo and "Pepsi-Twist" trade name.

Pepsi Twist made a brief return in the Summer of 2008 with the NFL Kickoff Limited Edition Flavor, which boasted that it was Pepsi "with a kick of Lemon."

In Czech Republic and Slovakia, Pepsi Twist was introduced in 2002, its diet counterpart Pepsi Twist Light was introduced in January 2003. Both versions are still being sold.

In Latvia, Pepsi Twist was introduced in late 2011.

In Poland, 10 years after Pepsi Twist was introduced, PepsiCo decided to introduce Pepsi Light Lemon.

In Cyprus, Pepsi Twist is introduced in the start of 2014.

In Uruguay, Pepsi Twist was first launched in 2005. Now, 10 years after reintroduced in limited edition. September 2015.

In July 2017, it was brought back as a limited time offer in Canada.

Marketing
The product was advertised during Super Bowl 2003, with Ozzy, Jack, and Kelly Osbourne appearing in the commercial, along with Florence Henderson and Donny and Marie Osmond.

It was also endorsed by pop singer Britney Spears in 2002 and 2003 as part of her contract with the company; it also appeared in a promotion with Austin Powers in Goldmember.

The product appears to be no longer actively marketed and does not appear on the list of brands on Pepsi's official website. Pepsi Twist production was ended in the U.S. during the summer of 2006, however the drink is still available in Poland, Germany, Italy, Serbia, China and some other nations.

In 2005, Japanese toy company Takara released a special edition Transformers Optimus Prime (known as "Convoy" in Japan) figure in Pepsi colors with a bottle/can holding trailer. Known as Pepsi Convoy, this figure comes pre-packaged with a cardboard Pepsi Twist bottle. This figure was later released two years later in America as "Pepsi Optimus Prime", with some slight modifications.

In 2008, the product was briefly re-introduced before the American football season but was in short supply.

Professional wrestler CM Punk dubbed one of his signature moves the Pepsi Twist.

See also
List of Pepsi types

References

PepsiCo cola brands
Products introduced in 2000
Discontinued soft drinks